Charles A. Cady (September 7, 1829 –  September 23, 1912) was a member of the Wisconsin State Assembly.

Biography
Cady was born on September 7, 1829, in Duanesburg, New York. In 1851 he married Hellen Blood (1832–1912). They moved to Newport, Wisconsin in 1852, to Dell Prairie, Wisconsin in 1862, and to Kilbourn, Wisconsin (now Wisconsin Dells) in 1889. Cady died at his home in Kilbourn on or before September 23, 1912.

Career
Cady was first a member of the Assembly from 1872 to 1873. He was elected to the Assembly again in 1879. In addition, Cady was chairman of the Dell Prairie Board of Supervisors. He was a Republican.

References

External links

People from Duanesburg, New York
People from Columbia County, Wisconsin
People from Adams County, Wisconsin
Republican Party members of the Wisconsin State Assembly
1829 births
1912 deaths